Amphibian Airplanes of Canada (AAC) is a developer and marketer of light amphibious aircraft based in Squamish, British Columbia.

AAC was established by Hans Schaer in Squamish, British Columbia in 1998 to develop a light amphibious aircraft to be marketed for homebuilding.

Aircraft 
 AAC SeaStar
 AAC Seastar Sealoon

References

External links 

Aircraft manufacturers of Canada